CGHS may refer to:
 Central Government Health Scheme
 Cooperative Group Housing Society
 CGHS model
 Schools in:

 Bangladesh
 Chittagong Government High School
 India
 Calcutta Girls' High School
 New Zealand
 Christchurch Girls' High School
 Taiwan (Republic of China)
 Cheng Kung Senior High School (Taipei)
 United States
 Cottage Grove High School in Cottage Grove, Oregon
 Center Grove High School in Greenwood, Indiana
 Coral Glades High School in Coral Springs, Florida
 Cardinal Gibbons High School (Fort Lauderdale, Florida)
 Cardinal Gibbons High School (Raleigh, North Carolina)
 Coral Gables Senior High School in Coral Gables, Florida (Miami area)